The origins of HMS Carlotta are obscure. In January 1812, Admiral Edward Pellew appointed Lieutenant Richard Howell Fleming to command Pyllades, later renamed Carlotta.

Some sources treat this Carlotta as the salvaged Carlotta. However, the database of the National Maritime Museum (NMM) treats them as two vessels. Currently available online resources do not yield information on Pylades, or her capture or other origin. There were apparently no French naval vessels of that name, suggesting that she was a merchant vessel. Furthermore, the NMM database allocates the capture of the brig Carlotta to HMS Carlotta captured in 1810, and Pylades to the second HMS Carlotta.

Under Fleming's command Carlotta captured several small vessels, including a French privateer, and partook of various services on the coasts of Tuscany and Genoa. Carlotta shared in the proceeds from the capture on 24 May 1813 of the privateer Columbo, which may be the privateer alluded to.

On 13 October 1812 Carlotta detained the settee St Vittoria and put a prize crew consisting of Midshipman Hugh Stewart Morris and two sailors, Francis Baynson and François Richie, on board with instructions that they were to sail her in company with Carlotta to Malta. However, on 19 October, St Vittoria went her own way, stopping first at Port St Vito and then to sailing on to Palermo. There Morris sold part of her cargo. After spending almost three weeks at Palermo, Stewart sailed to Cephalu where he disposed of the rest of the cargo. Then he scuttled St Vittoria, but sold the wreck for 373 ounces of gold to a man named "Fellipo". Morris, Baynson, and Richie split the proceeds and made their way to Messina. However, Lieutenant-colonel Coffin, the deputy quartermaster general at Messina, arrested them as they were about to take a boat to Calabria, and sent them to Malta. A court martial convened at Port Mahon aboard  on 8 and 9 April 1813 sentenced all three miscreants to be mulcted of all outstanding pay and prize money. It also sentenced Morris to two years of solitary confinement, after which he could never serve as a petty officer or officer in the Navy. Baynson was sentenced to 200 lashes. Richie was an impressed Frenchman and the court martial ruled that he was to be treated as a prisoner of war.

Carlotta was paid off in February 1815 and broken up in May at Pater (Pembroke Dock).

Notes, citations, and references
Notes

Citations

References
O’Byrne, William R. (1849) A naval biographical dictionary: comprising the life and services of every living officer in Her Majesty's navy, from the rank of admiral of the fleet to that of lieutenant, inclusive. (London: J. Murray), vol. 1.

Brigs of the Royal Navy